Martin Eden is a 2019 Italian-French historical romance drama film directed by Pietro Marcello. It was selected to compete for the Golden Lion at the 76th Venice International Film Festival, where Luca Marinelli won the Volpi Cup for Best Actor. The film is  loosely based on the 1909 novel of the same name by Jack London and follows a sailor trying to remake himself as a writer in a timeless 20th century Italy.

Cast

Production
Principal photography for the film began in May 2018 in Naples, Italy.

Release
The film had its world premiere at the Venice International Film Festival on 2 September 2019. It was screened at the 2019 Toronto International Film Festival in the Platform Prize program, and was announced as the winner of the Platform Prize on 12 September.

It was released in Italy by 01 Distribution on 4 September 2019. It was released in France by Shellac Distribution on 16 October 2019.

Response

Box office
Martin Eden grossed $0 in North America due to the ongoing COVID-19 pandemic, Kino Lorber opted for a VOD release, and $3 million in other territories.

Critical reception
According to the website's critical consensus: "Martin Eden uses one man's quest for fulfillment as fuel for an ambitious—and often rewarding—look at a complex array of social and personal themes." On Metacritic, the film holds a rating of 75 out of 100, based on 22 critics, indicating "generally positive reviews".

References

External links

2019 films
2010s historical romance films
2019 romantic drama films
2010s Italian-language films
French romantic drama films
French historical romance films
Italian romantic drama films
Italian historical romance films
Films about interclass romance
Films about social class
Films about writers
Films based on works by Jack London
Films set in the 1900s
Films set in Naples
Films shot in Naples
Films based on American novels
Films directed by Pietro Marcello
2010s French films